Turtles in Time may refer to:

 Teenage Mutant Ninja Turtles: Turtles in Time, an arcade video game produced by Konami
 Teenage Mutant Ninja Turtles: Turtles in Time Re-Shelled, an enhanced remake of the 1991 arcade game
 Teenage Mutant Ninja Turtles III, of which "The Turtles are back... in time" was one of this movie's marketing slogans.
 "A Turtle in Time", a season 10 episode of the 1987 TV series Teenage Mutant Ninja Turtles